Jone Logavatu Kalouniwai is a major general in the Republic of Fiji Military Forces (RFMF) who currently serves as the commander of the Republic of Fiji Military Forces since 16 September 2021. Previously served as director general of National Security and Intelligence, Ministry of Defence and National Security from May 2020 to September 2021, he also served as section commander in Lebanon and instructor at the RFMF Training School.

Prior to his appointment as commander of RFMF, he was promoted to the rank of major general by the prime minister of Fiji on 4 October 2021.

Career 
Kalouniwai joined the RFMF on 23 October 1987, however he was commissioned into the Officers Corp on 10 May 1992.

Kalouniwai obtained military courses in Fiji in addition to receiving his training in Newzealand, Taiwan, India and Australia. While attending defense and peace keeping seminars, he visited the United States, United Kingdom, Sweden, Nepal, and South Korea. A graduate of the Australian War College, 2019, he also obtained defense training from Defence Services Staff College, India in 2008.

He obtained his executive certificate in management from the Australian Maritime College, diploma in management from Central Queensland University, and MBA from the same university. He received his master's degree in defense and strategic studies from the University of Madras, Policy studies from Deakin University.

As a commissioned officer, he was deployed at various units and  participated in various missions with the Multinational Force and Observers in Sinai and Egypt, in addition to serving in the United Nations Interim Force in Lebanon, East Timor, Iraq, and the Golan Heights, Syria. During that period, Kalouniwai was assigned various command and staff appointments. His last command appointment was at the Multinational Force and Observers, Sinai Peninsula where he commanded 2nd Battalion of the Fiji Infantry Regiment.

His last staff appointment includes as a colonel in Syria at the UN mission Chief of Staff for the United Nations Disengagement Observer Force where he was assigned to oversee the operational and strategic functions of the MFO's headquarter from 2014-15 and 2015-16.

Awards and decorations 
 Meritorious Service Decoration
 Multinational Force and Observers Medal
 UNFIL Peacekeeping Medal
 UNAMI Peacekeeping Medal
 UNMISET Peacekeeping Medal  United Nations Medal
 UNDOF Peacekeeping Medal
 Fiji Republic Medal

References 

Fijian military leaders
Central Queensland University alumni
National Defence College, India alumni
Deakin University alumni
Year of birth missing (living people)
Place of birth missing (living people)
Living people